Cornille of Burgundy, also called Cornille of Beveren (1420 – May 16, 1452) was an illegitimate son of Philip the Good, Duke of Burgundy, and Catherine Scaers. 

Cornille was the first and favorite bastard son of Philip the Good and received the titles of Grand Bâtard de Bourgogne, Lord of  Beveren and Vlissingen, and was also Governor and Captain-General of the Duchy of Luxembourg.

Although he never married, Cornille had two children with Margareta Courbaulde, Lady of Elverdinge:
 Jérôme, Bastard of Burgundy (1450–1471)
 Jean, Bastard of Burgundy (1450–1479), killed in the Battle of Guinegate (1479), Lord of  Elverdinge and Vlamertinge, married with Marie de Halewyn, and father of two daughters.

After his death in the Battle of Bazel near Rupelmonde, Cornille was buried in the St. Michael and St. Gudula Cathedral in Brussels. All his titles and possessions went to his younger half-brother Anthony, bastard of Burgundy.

References

Sources

Nobility of the Burgundian Netherlands
1420 births
1452 deaths
House of Valois-Burgundy
Philip the Good (Duke of Burgundy)